Autumn Dew, also known as Whirlwind Victory, was one of Emperor Taizong's warhorses. According to historical records, he was being ridden by the emperor during a great siege when an arrow pierced the horse's breast, and the emperor was forced to exchange horses with his general, Qiu Xinggong. Autumn Dew is believed to be one of the horses portrayed in the stone reliefs known as the Six Steeds of Zhao Mausoleum, in which a man, possibly Qiu Xinggong, is shown removing the arrow. The six reliefs commissioned by Taizong for his mausoleum were placed outside his tomb on an altar meant for memorial ceremonies. In 1914, an American collector purchased two of the reliefs, one of which showed Autumn Dew, from local dealer C.T. Loo and had them shipped back to the USA, where they are now in the possession of the Penn Museum.

References

Sources

Chinese sculpture
Stone sculptures in China
Horses in art
Tang dynasty art
Individual warhorses
Emperor Taizong of Tang